Motena Cave Natural Monument is a karst cave located 0.7 km to the south from  village First Balda (Pirveli Baldi  ) in Martvili Municipality in Samegrelo-Zemo Svaneti region of Georgia,  437 meters above sea level. Cave is located on left bank of Abasha river.  In Middle Ages Motena cave was integral part of the now lost fortress.

Morphology 
Motena Cave is a karst cave, formed in Askhi karst massif. The total length of the cave is 75 m.
It has two storey with big hall on each connected by a narrow passage. The first hall is 30 m in length and 24–25 m in height.
Cave is naturally decorated with many stalactites, stalagmites, travertine cascades  and cave curtains. Part of the cave has collapsed and mortared stone wall is protecting cave interior.

Fauna 
The inhabitants of the cave are spiders and insects, namely Trachysphaera, Heteromurus, Lepidocyrtus, Tomocerus, Sphaerozetes, Chamobates, Porobelba, Adaugammarus, Parasitus, Pergamasus, Xiphocaridinella, Troglocaridicola, Scutariella, and Tectocepheus.

See also 
Jortsku Cave Natural Monument
Balda Canyon Natural Monument

References

Natural monuments of Georgia (country)
Caves of Georgia (country)
Protected areas established in 2007
Geography of Imereti